Carl Leslie Baer (February 26, 1918 – July 8, 1996) was an American professional basketball player. He played for the Youngstown Bears in the National Basketball League for one game during the 1945–46 season.

References

1918 births
1996 deaths
American men's basketball players
Basketball players from Pennsylvania
Centers (basketball)
People from Aliquippa, Pennsylvania
Youngstown Bears players